Michael Tao Dai Yu (born 26 August 1963) is a Hong Kong television actor.

Career
Tao entered the acting industry in the 1980s, affiliating with TVB. It was during this period that Tao earned the name "Housewife Killer" due to his overwhelming popularity amongst housewives (who arguably constitute a majority of television viewing audiences in Hong Kong), solidifying his position as a first tier television actor in TVB.

Tao later moved over to rival ATV in 1997 after problems over his contract with TVB. His ATV series Flaming Brothers defeated the TVB rival show at the time, a landmark for ATV. Apart from filming ATV series, Tao has also filmed in China and Singapore. He returned to TVB in 2004 and has starred in a number of television series since. Once again, problems with his contract resulted in Tao leaving TVB in 2009 and worked mostly in mainland China and occasionally in Hong Kong.

In 2021, Tao gained popularity after numerous videos of him singing Andy Lau's 1996 song "Reverse The Earth" (Chinese: 倒轉地球) in a unique voice and style resurfaced. Tao was known to have performed at various Chinese malls singing various Cantonese/Mandarin pop songs for commercial events since 2020, and was imitated across the internet by various netizens, including Douyin, YouTube and Poki Ng from the Hong Kong boyband ERROR. This has also led to creation of fan groups on Facebook humorously advocating for Tao to become a full-fledged singer. Tao has responded positively, saying he enjoys entertaining people and jokingly hopes being able to catch up after Louis Koo's spot as favourite male singer in Hong Kong's Ultimate Song Chart Awards Presentation (Chinese: 叱咤樂壇流行榜頒獎典禮).

Filmography

References

1963 births
Living people
Hong Kong male television actors
TVB veteran actors
Asia Television
20th-century Hong Kong male actors
21st-century Hong Kong male actors